Abrus madagascariensis is a plant in the legume family Fabaceae, native to Madagascar. It grows as a herb, shrub or liana.

Distribution and habitat
Abrus madagascariensis is endemic to Madagascar, where it is confined to Antsiranana and Mahajanga provinces, including the Sambirano region, in the north and northwest of the country. Its habitat is in dry deciduous woodland from sea level to  altitude.

Conservation
, there were only 11 known subpopulations of Abrus madagascariensis. Wildfires are the main threat to the species' habitat. Eight subpopulations are present in protected areas (including Ankarafantsika National Park) where the species is conserved.

References

Faboideae
Endemic flora of Madagascar
Plants described in 1952
Flora of the Madagascar dry deciduous forests